The 2014-15 Ligue 1 season was the 52nd of the competition of the first-tier football in Senegal and the seventh professional season.  The tournament was organized by the Senegalese Football Federation.  The season began earlier on 6 December and finished later on 26 July.  It was the seventh season labelled as a "League" ("Ligue" in French).  AS Douanes won their sixth and recent title and qualified into the 2016 CAF Champions League.  Génération Foot, winner of the 2015 Senegalese Cup qualified for the first time in the 2016 CAF Confederation Cup the following season.

The season featured 14 clubs, of which five were outside the Dakar area, though SUNEOR Diourbel played in Dakar, every club that participated were in the western third of Senegal, It also had 182 matches and fewer goals which numbered 348, four higher than last season.

AS Pikine was the defending team of the title.

Participating clubs

Stadiums and locations

Touré Kunda (or Kounda) Foot Pro, also as ASC Touré Kunda (or Kounda) became Mbour Petite-Côte FC

Overview
The league was contested by 14 teams.

League standings

References

External links
 2015 Senegalese season at RSSSF
 Standings at FIFA site

Senegal
Senegal Premier League seasons